Marcelo Boeck (born 28 November 1984) is a Brazilian professional footballer who plays as a goalkeeper.

Club career

Internacional
Born in Vera Cruz, Rio Grande do Sul of Belgian descent, Boeck started his professional career with Sport Club Internacional, being part of the squads that won the 2006 Copa Libertadores, the 2006 FIFA Club World Cup and the 2007 Recopa Sudamericana, as well as the Campeonato Gaúcho on two occasions. 

In four years, he played only 16 official games.

Marítimo
Boeck signed a three-year contract with C.S. Marítimo of Portugal on 17 August 2007. He totalled just five Primeira Liga matches in his first three seasons, acting as backup to successively Marcos and Peterson Peçanha and also fighting for second-choice status with Bruno Grassi, all three his compatriots; additionally, he also appeared on and off for the reserves in the third division.

In the 2010–11 campaign, Boeck won the battle for the starting job with Peçanha, and played all 30 league fixtures for the Madeirans as they finished in mid-table.

Sporting CP
On 30 June 2011, Boeck joined Sporting CP on a five-year deal for an undisclosed fee. He played second-fiddle to youth graduate and Portuguese international Rui Patrício during his spell.

When the team celebrated winning the Supertaça Cândido de Oliveira on 10 August 2015, Boeck doused striker Islam Slimani in champagne, angering the Algerian due to his Islamic faith's prohibition of alcohol. The following 8 January, he extended his contract until 2018 with an option for a further year.

Boeck appeared in 27 competitive matches in his four-and-a-half-year tenure at the Estádio José Alvalade.

Chapecoense
In the last days of the 2016 January transfer window, Boeck returned to his country and its Série A, joining Associação Chapecoense de Futebol who retained 50% of his sporting rights. He did not board LaMia Flight 2933 for the 2016 Copa Sudamericana Finals, which crashed and killed 19 of his teammates, because it was his birthday.

Fortaleza
Boeck moved to Fortaleza Esporte Clube in December 2016. He was a very important part of the squads that won two consecutive promotions from Série C, but lost his starting spot in 2019 to new signing Felipe Alves.

Immediately after his contract expired in December 2021, the 37-year-old Boeck agreed to a one-year extension.

Career statistics

Honours
Internacional
FIFA Club World Cup: 2006
Copa Libertadores: 2006
Campeonato Gaúcho: 2005

Sporting CP
Taça de Portugal: 2014–15
Supertaça Cândido de Oliveira: 2015

Chapecoense
Copa Sudamericana: 2016 (posthumously)
Campeonato Catarinense: 2016

Fortaleza
Campeonato Brasileiro Série B: 2018
Copa do Nordeste: 2019, 2022
Campeonato Cearense: 2019, 2020, 2021, 2022

References

External links

1984 births
Living people
Brazilian people of Belgian descent
Sportspeople from Rio Grande do Sul
Brazilian footballers
Association football goalkeepers
Campeonato Brasileiro Série A players
Campeonato Brasileiro Série B players
Campeonato Brasileiro Série C players
Sport Club Internacional players
Associação Chapecoense de Futebol players
Fortaleza Esporte Clube players
Primeira Liga players
Liga Portugal 2 players
Segunda Divisão players
C.S. Marítimo players
Sporting CP footballers
Sporting CP B players
Brazilian expatriate footballers
Expatriate footballers in Portugal
Brazilian expatriate sportspeople in Portugal